Saris can refer to:

 Saris, former Palestinian Arab village in Israel
 Šariš, Region in northeastern Slovakia
 Veľký Šariš, eastern Slovakia
 Šariš, a beer from Šariš Brewery, largest brewery in Slovakia 
 Saris, Western Finland, village in Finland
 Saris (surname)
 the plural of Sari (Indian female costume)

See also 
 Sari (disambiguation)